Tung Shan is a mountain between Tate's Cairn and Kowloon Peak in Kowloon, Hong Kong. Its summit is 544 m (1,818 ft) high.

See also
List of mountains, peaks and hills in Hong Kong
Eight Mountains of Kowloon

Mountains, peaks and hills of Hong Kong
New Territories
Sai Kung District